Momentum is the eight full-length studio album of Italian progressive metal band DGM. This is the second album with this line-up and it was released on March 26, 2013 for the last time by Italian label Scarlet Records. The album was produced by band guitarist Simone Mularoni.

On March 13, "Reason" was released as its first single and on June 19 "Trust" was released.

Track listing
All music written by Mark Basile and Simone Mularoni. All lyrics written by Basile, Andrea Arcangeli and Fabio Costantino.

Personnel

 Mark Basile – vocals
 Simone Mularoni – guitars
 Andrea Arcangeli – bass
 Fabio Costantino – drums
 Emanuele Casali – keyboards

Additional personnel
 Russell Allen – guest vocals on Reason
 Jorn Viggo Lofstad – guest guitar solo on Chaos
 Marco Mantovani – additional orchestration on Trust, Universe and Blame

References

2013 albums
DGM (band) albums